Omkara is a 2006 Indian crime drama film adapted from William Shakespeare's Othello, co-written and directed by Vishal Bhardwaj. It stars an ensemble cast of Ajay Devgn, Kareena Kapoor, Saif Ali Khan, Konkona Sen Sharma, Vivek Oberoi and Bipasha Basu in lead roles. The director Vishal Bhardwaj himself composed the entire music for the film, including the background score, with lyrics by Gulzar. The film is set in Meerut, a city in Uttar Pradesh. It is the second film in Bhardwaj's trilogy of Shakespeare adaptations, which began with Maqbool (2003) and was completed with Haider (2014).

Omkara released on 28 July 2006, and proved to be a moderate commercial success at the box office, due to its dark theme and strong language which kept away family audiences. However, it received widespread critical acclaim, with praise for its direction, story, screenplay, dialogues, soundtrack and performances of the ensemble cast, with particular praise directed towards Devgn, Kapoor, Khan and Sen Sharma's performances. 

At the 54th National Film Awards, Omkara won 3 awards, including Best Supporting Actress (Sen Sharma). At the 52nd Filmfare Awards, the film received 19 nominations, including Best Director (Bhardwaj) and Best Actress (Kapoor), and won a leading 9 awards, including Best Actress (Critics) (Kapoor), Best Supporting Actress (Sen Sharma) and Best Villain (Khan), 

Omkara was showcased in the Marché du Film section at the 2006 Cannes Film Festival along with a book on the making of the film. It was also selected to be screened at the Cairo International Film Festival, where Bhardwaj was awarded for Best Artistic Contribution in Cinema of a Director, in addition to winning 3 awards at the Kara Film Festival, and an award at the Asian Festival of First Films.

Plot 
Omkara "Omi" Shukla is an enforcer for a gang that commits political crimes for the local politician Tiwari Bhaisaab. Ishwar "Langda" Tyagi and Keshav "Kesu Firangi" Upadhyay are his closest lieutenants. Langda gatecrashes a baraat and challenges Rajju, the groom, to try and stop Omkara from abducting the bride, Dolly Mishra. Rajju fails and the wedding never takes place.

Dolly's father, advocate Raghunath Mishra, is enraged with Omkara and at one point threatens to kill him. To sort out the misunderstanding, Bhaisaab arranges for Dolly to appear before her father; she clarifies that she eloped with Omkara and was not abducted. Her father remains disgusted and scared that she is in love with a man from a lower caste as well as a violent criminal and leaves the village in shame.

Omkara and his gang compromise Indore Singh, an electoral rival of Bhaisaab, by exploiting an MMS sex scandal; they also kill several of Singh's enforcers, while allowing one of them,  Kichlu, to live. Bhaisaab is elected for parliament and Omkara is promoted to the candidate for the upcoming state elections. 

Omkara appoints Kesu over Langda as his successor once he enters politics himself, as he feels Kesu, who hails from the upper classes and is college-educated, stands a better chance of winning over the younger, educated voting crowd than Langda, who is rustic and dropped out of school. 

Langda, disappointed with Omkara's poor judgment and jealous of Kesu, his younger, less-experienced superior, decides to take revenge. He first causes a violent brawl between Kesu and Rajju by taking advantage of Kesu's low threshold for alcohol, which damages Omkara's faith in Kesu. Langda has Kesu convince Dolly to mollify Omkara, but at the same time uses Kesu's visits to Dolly as evidence to suggest to Omkara that the two of them are having an affair. Langda additionally has Indu, his wife and Omkara's sister, steal an expensive piece of jewelry that Omkara gifted to Dolly, and encourages Kesu to gift it to his girlfriend Billo. 

Billo is later used to lure Kichlu out of hiding, so Omkara's gang can assassinate him. Omkara, Langda and their associates arrive at the hideout, where Billo is dancing. Omkara then chases down and murders Kichlu in a rage. Later, after they kill several people on a train, Omkara beats Langda and demands that he unambiguously tell him whether Kesu and Dolly are having an affair. Langda insists that they are. 

On the wedding day, a bird drops a snake into paint being used by Dolly: a bad omen. Indu tells her brother not to marry Dolly if he has any doubts. Omkara is still unsure, and demands proof from Langda. Later, Langda tricks Omkara into believing that Kesu's explicit talk about Billo is referring to Dolly, and arranges for Omkara to watch Billo drop Omkara's heirloom jewelry at Kesu's door.

Convinced of the affair, Omkara smothers Dolly to death on their wedding night. Elsewhere, Langda shoots Kesu, who collapses but survives. Rajju shoots himself. Hearing gunfire, Indu rushes to Omkara, where she finds Dolly's corpse and the recovered jewelry. She confesses to having stolen the jewelry for Langda, making Omkara realize that Langda is responsible for his fatal misunderstanding. As Langda leaves, Indu slashes his throat in retribution. The wounded Kesu enters, asking Omkara "How did you ever think...?" Omkara shoots himself in the chest and dies next to his wife.

Cast and characters

Character Outlines 
 Omkara "Omi" Shukla – Omkara is a hardened goon, equivalent to a capo, a man with principles who sees life in extremes, either as good or evil. He is the illegitimate child of a higher-caste Brahmin man and a lower-caste woman.
 Dolly Mishra – Dolly is a playful, innocent, young woman, smitten by Omi. She is the one who expresses her love for him and lays the basis of their relationship. Throughout the narrative, other characters are shown to doubt her innocence, including her father. Omi finds her personality ambiguous, resulting in the tragic end.
 Ishwar "Langda" Tyagi – Langda (which means limp in Hindi) is the catalyst in the story. He had been a loyal right-hand man to Omi for years and expected to be the next bahubali. Kesu's promotion gives a crushing blow to his ambitions and brings out the evil in him. His jealousy and hatred towards his kin is further encouraged by chiding remarks from Rajju.
 Indu Tyagi – Indu leads a bittersweet life as Langda Tyagi's wife. She becomes an unwitting aid in her husband's plan.
 Keshav "Kesu Firangi" Upadhyay – Kesu is Omi's other deputy. His epithet comes from his knowledge of English. He is college-educated and urban, known to be somewhat of a casanova. He is important to Omi for his political contacts in the students. After admitting to having "known" a string of women, he falls in love with Billo and proposes marriage. He is shown to be impatient and easily frustrated with a low threshold for alcohol.
 Billo Chamanbahar – Billo is a singer/dancer who melts hearts with just her looks. She sees Kesu as a future companion, though keeps him hanging on. She makes an easy tool for Langda to manipulate.
Rajan "Rajju" Tiwari – Son of a respectable thekedar, he is head-over-heels in love with Dolly. He tries to win her affection throughout the movie.
 Tiwari Bhaisaab – Bhaisaab is an influential and powerful politician that many characters defer to. He is an outwardly sophisticated man, with a ruthless interior. He is a politician to the bone and rules the region with an iron fist, picking up enemies as he progresses his career. He is a father figure for Omkara as well as the political head honcho.

Supporting Cast
 Kuldeep Kumar as Golu, Langda's son
 Manav Kaushik as Surendra Kaptaan
 Pankaj Tripathi as Kichlu

Shooting Locations 
Omkara was shot over a period of 4 months across various locales, including Lonavala, Lucknow University, Allahabad, Satara, Mahabaleshwar, Mumbai; and Wai, Maharashtra, where bulk of the shooting took place. Even though most of the shooting took place in Maharashtra, sets were erected with precise details to create an authentic Uttar Pradesh village.

Production 
Members of the production team included stunt coordinator Jai Singh, costume designer Dolly Ahluwalia, choreographers Bhushan Lakhandri and Ganesh Acharya along with chief assistant director Ajit Ahuja.

The title of the film was decided by a popular vote. Moviegoers had a choice among Omkara, Issak and O Saathi Re, all of which had already appeared as the film's song titles. Sushmita Sen was the first choice for Kapoor's role. Aamir Khan was originally considered for Saif's role. Bhardwaj and Aamir were going to collaborate on an earlier project but due to creative differences, the film was shelved. Bhardwaj thought about casting Khan in this film, but decided against it and approached Saif.

Home media 
The film is available for streaming on Eros Now. A censored version with CBFC "U/A" rating is available on ZEE5.

Reception 
Omkara had a fairly good performance at the box office in India and earned critical acclaim all over. The movie grossed $16,466,144 worldwide in its total run at the box office. Even though the movie received rave reviews, the dark theme and strong language kept away family audiences. It was, however, a grand success abroad. The film quickly entered the UK's Top 10 and did very well in Australia, South Africa and the United States.

Omkara was universally acclaimed and was praised for its taut script, dramatic sequences and its lead performances. Kareena Kapoor's and Ajay Devgn's performance was considered to be the finest of their films, yet it was Saif Ali Khan's performance that was labeled as the real milestone of the film and drew the most and unanimous critical praise as Langda Tyagi. Director Vishal Bhardwaj says it was Aamir Khan who was keen to star in the role of Langda Tyagi initially, but finally it was Saif Ali Khan who bagged the role. Konkana Sen, who eventually won a National Award for her performance, was also highly praised.

Language 
All the dialogues in the film are delivered in a strong input of the Khariboli dialect other than Hindi, including the use of swear words, generally absent from mainstream Hindi cinema. The movie received an A Certificate from the censor board of India. Critics and audiences were divided in their opinions about the foul language. Many believed that it was not required and would lead to distancing the movie from the family audience, while some applauded it for authentically showing the rustic setting of the story. The language and A certificate narrowed the audience but in turn brought accolades for the creators of the movie for valuing creativity over commercial success.

Soundtrack 

The music is composed by Vishal Bhardwaj and the lyrics are penned by Gulzar. The music was released on 7 July 2006. The official soundtrack contains 8 tracks. In 2007, the track "Beedi" was used as the Baganiya Song called "Hariya" which was sung by Zubeen Garg and Anamika Tanti from the album Jhumka. In January 2009, it was also used as the theme tune to a Brazilian TV soap opera called Caminho das Índias, produced by Rede Globo. On the back of this success, "Beedi" received considerable airplay on pop radio stations in Brazil becoming the first Hindi-only song to achieve this. The mini-series' soundtrack, which includes the track, went on to become one of the biggest selling albums of the year. Eventually, Bipasha Basu became the talking point of the film for giving 2 chartbuster songs, "Beedi" and "Namak", both of which became immensely popular. According to the Indian trade website Box Office India, with around  units sold, this film's soundtrack album was the year's eleventh highest-selling.

Track listing 
Music Director – Vishal Bhardwaj

Accolades

Notes

See also 

 Kaliyattam (1997)
 India – A Love Story – A TV series from Brazil with the "Beedi" theme song taken from Omkara.

References

External links 

 
 
 

2006 films
Indian erotic drama films
2000s erotic drama films
2000s Hindi-language films
2006 crime drama films
Modern adaptations of works by William Shakespeare
Films directed by Vishal Bhardwaj
Films about organised crime in India
Films set in Uttar Pradesh
Films based on Othello
Films featuring a Best Supporting Actress National Film Award-winning performance
Films scored by Vishal Bhardwaj
Indian films based on plays
Indian crime drama films
Films with screenplays by Robin Bhatt
Films that won the Best Audiography National Film Award